Saltlick Creek is a tributary of the Little Kanawha River,  long, located in central West Virginia in the United States.

Saltlick Creek flows for its entire length in Braxton County. Downstream of Rollyson, the creek is paralleled by West Virginia Route 5.

According to the West Virginia Department of Environmental Protection, approximately 80% of the Saltlick Creek watershed is forested, mostly deciduous.  Approximately 18% is used for pasture and agriculture.

According to the Geographic Names Information System, Saltlick Creek has historically been known by the variant names "Salt Lick," "Salt Lick Creek," "Salt Lick Fork," and "Saltlick Fork." The creek was named for a nearby mineral lick.

See also
List of rivers of West Virginia

References 

Rivers of West Virginia
Little Kanawha River
Rivers of Braxton County, West Virginia